The Volkswagen Group A0 platform is a series of automobile platforms shared among superminis of various marques of the Volkswagen Group.

Under Volkswagen's revised platform naming system, the "A04" platform is now known as the PQ24 platform, and what may have been called the A05 platform is officially the PQ25 platform.  The new nomenclature is derived as follows:

P indicates a passenger car platform
Q (quer) indicates a transverse engine
2 indicates the platform size or class
5 indicates the generation

A01
A01 (Typ 86) platform cars:
Audi 50 (1974–1978)
Volkswagen Polo Mk1 (1975–1981)
Volkswagen Derby (1977–1981)

A02
A02 (Typ 86C) platform cars:
Volkswagen Polo Mk2/Polo Classic/Derby (1981–1994)

A03
A03 platform cars:
SEAT Ibiza Mk2 (Typ 6K, 1993–2002)
SEAT Córdoba Mk1 (Typ 6K/6KC/6KV, 1993–2002)
Volkswagen Polo Mk3 (Typ 6N/6KV, 1994–2002)
Volkswagen Polo Playa (1996–2002) - a rebadged SEAT Ibiza 6K with some cosmetic components from the Volkswagen Polo 6KV
SEAT Inca van (Typ 6K9, 1997–2005)
Volkswagen Caddy van (Typ 9K, 1996–2004)
The Volkswagen A00 platform is derived from the A03 platform as well, being a shortened version of it.

A04 (PQ24)
A04 platform cars, now officially referred to as the PQ24 platform:
Škoda Fabia Mk1 (Typ 6Y, 1999–2007)
Audi A2 (Typ 8Z, 1999–2005)
Volkswagen Polo Mk4 (Typ 9N, 2001–2009)
SEAT Ibiza Mk3 (Typ 6L, 2002–2008)
SEAT Córdoba Mk2 (Typ 6L, 2002–2009)
Volkswagen Fox (Typ 5Z, 2004-2021)
Volkswagen Suran/SpaceFox (Typ 5Z6, 2004-2019)
Škoda Fabia Mk2 (Typ 5J, 2007–2014, uses portions of PQ24 and PQ25 platform)
Volkswagen Gol Mk5 (Typ 5U, 2008–present, PQ24/25 hybrid)
Volkswagen Voyage Mk2 (Typ 5U, 2008–present, PQ24/25 hybrid)
Volkswagen Saveiro Mk5 (Typ 5U, 2009–present, PQ24/25 hybrid)

A05 (PQ25) 
PQ25 is a development of the PQ24 platform with the possibility of all-wheel drive, informally known as A05.
SEAT Ibiza Mk4 (Typ 6J, 2008–2015)
Volkswagen Polo Mk5 Pre-Facelift (Typ 6R, 2009–2014; Typ 61, 2010–present)
Audi A1 (Typ 8X, 2010–2018)
Škoda Rapid (Typ NA, 2011–2021, only for Indian market)
Volkswagen Vento (Typ 60, 2010–present)
"New A05+"
Škoda Rapid (Typ NH, 2012–2016)
SEAT Toledo Mk4 (Typ KG, 2012–2018)
Volkswagen Santana (Typ BR, 2012–2022, China)
Volkswagen Jetta (Typ BS, 2013–2019, China)
Jetta VA3 (Typ 0M, 2019–present, China)
Volkswagen Polo (Typ CK, 2020–2022, Russia)

A06 (PQ26) 
Volkswagen Polo Mk5 Facelift (Typ 6C, 2014–2017)
Škoda Fabia Mk3 (Typ NJ, 2014–present)
Škoda Rapid (2017–present)
SEAT Ibiza Mk4 Facelift (Typ 6P, 2015-2017)

References

External links
Volkswagen Group corporate website

A0